Sir Thomas Hare, 5th Baronet (27 July 1930 – 25 January 1993) was an English first-class cricketer. Hare played first-class cricket for Cambridge University and the Free Foresters in 1953–54.  He succeeded his father as the 5th Baronet of the Stow Hall Baronetcy in 1976, before being succeeded by his cousin upon his death in 1993.

Life and first-class cricket
The son of Sir Ralph Hare and his wife, Doreen Pleasance Anna Bagge, he was born at Westminster in July 1930. He was educated at Eton College, before going up to Magdalene College, Cambridge. He debuted in minor counties cricket for Norfolk in the 1947 Minor Counties Championship. In between leaving Eton and going up to the University of Cambridge, Hare carried out his National Service with the Coldstream Guards as a second lieutenant in June 1949, with promotion to the rank of lieutenant in December 1950. While at Cambridge he made his debut in first-class cricket for Cambridge University against Sussex at Fenner's in 1953. He made eight further appearances for Cambridge in 1953, scoring 218 runs at an average of 15.57, with a high score of 47. With right-arm fast-medium bowling he took 18 wickets at a bowling average of 37.55, with best figures of 5 for 35, which came against Worcestershire. He played his final two minor counties fixtures for Norfolk in 1954, as well as appearing in a first-class fixture for the Free Foresters against Cambridge University.

He married Lady Rose Amanda Bligh in September 1961, with the couple having two children. Upon the death of his father in October 1976, he succeeded him as the 5th Baronet. Hare died at King's Lynn in January 1993. Upon his death, he was succeeded as the 6th Baronet by his cousin, Philip.

References

External links

1930 births
1993 deaths
People from Westminster
People educated at Eton College
English cricketers
Norfolk cricketers
Coldstream Guards officers
Alumni of Magdalene College, Cambridge
Cambridge University cricketers
Free Foresters cricketers
Baronets in the Baronetage of the United Kingdom